You Know FaUSt is a 1996 album by the German krautrock group Faust. It is their sixth album.

Recording

Music

Track listing
 "Hurricane" – 4.15	
 "Tenne Laufen" – 0.14	
 "C Pluus" – 7.03	
 pause – 0.02	
 "Irons" – 0.21	
 "Cendre" – 2.02	
 pause – 0.03	
 "Sixty Sixty" – 2.53	
 "Winds" – 0.31	
 "Liebeswehen" – 4.52	
 "Elektron II" – 1.10	
 "Ella" – 1.59	
 pause – 0.03	
 "Men from the Moon" – 1.59	
 "Der Pfad" – 0.55	
 "Noizes from Pythagoras" – 0.33
 pause – 0.05	
 "Na Sowas" – 14.31	
 "L'Oiseau" – 2.53	
 pause – 0.01	
 "Huttenfreak" – 0.31	
 "Teutonen Tango" – 6.59

Personnel
Werner "Zappi" Diermaier –	drums
Jean-Hervé Péron – bass guitar, vocals
Hans Joachim Irmler – organ, electronics	
Thomas E. Martin – guitar

References

External links
You Know FaUSt at Faust Pages
You Know FaUSt at Discogs

1996 albums
Faust (band) albums